El Mochito mine is an underground zinc and silver mine in Honduras that is owned by Ascendant Resources. The mine is located near the municipality of Las Vegas in northwest section Honduras.

History
The deposit was discovered in 1938. The Rosario Mining Company purchased the property in 1943 and began production in 1948. American Pacific Mining Corporation purchased the property in September 1987, and in March 1990, Breakwater Resources acquired American Pacific and the mine.

In August 2011, Nyrstar successfully completed its acquisition of Breakwater Resources. On December 20, 2016 the mine was acquired by the Canadian firm Morumbi Resources, which renamed itself to Ascendant Resources effective December 21, 2016.

See also
El Toqui mine
Nanisivik Mine

References

Underground mines in Honduras
Zinc mines
Silver mines in Honduras